The Stevenage Oilers played at the Stevenage Ice Bowl during the 1996/1997 season. They played in the English League Southern Conference. They finished the season with the following record: Played 22, Won 16, Lost 5, Drawn 1, Goals For 155, Goals Against 78.

In the playoffs Stevenage finished bottom of the four team Southern Conference with the following record: Played 6, Won 1, Lost 5, Drawn 0, Goals For 17, Goals Against 36.

Other Stevenage teams included the Stevenage Strikers (1989–1993) and the Stevenage Sharks (1992/93).

Sport in Hertfordshire
Defunct ice hockey teams in the United Kingdom
Ice hockey teams in England
Stevenage